Claude d'Anna (born 31 March 1945) is a French film director and screenwriter. He has directed 16 films since 1970. His film Salome was screened in the Un Certain Regard section the 1986 Cannes Film Festival. A year later his film Macbeth would be screened out of competition at the 1987 Festival.

Selected filmography
 L'Ordre et la sécurité du monde (1978)
  (1983)
 Salome (1986)
 Macbeth (1987)

References

External links

1945 births
Living people
French film directors
French male screenwriters
French screenwriters